The Treutlen County School District is a public school district in Treutlen County, Georgia, United States, based in Soperton. It serves the communities of Lothair and Soperton.

Schools
The Treutlen County School District has one elementary school and one middle/high school.

Elementary schools
Treutlen Elementary School

Middle-High school
Treutlen Middle/High School

References

External links

School districts in Georgia (U.S. state)
Education in Treutlen County, Georgia